Rollag Stave Church is a stave church in the municipality of Rollag in Viken county, Norway. The church is located a few kilometres north of the centre of the village of Rollag.

History
Rollag Stave Church was probably originally built in second half of the 12th century. It was first mentioned in written sources in 1425.  Rollag Stave Church is decorated with a mixture of artistic expressions from a series of periods from the early Middle Ages.

The church has been remodeled several times with not much left of the original building. Originally, the church had been a simple church with a rectangular nave. It was rebuilt around 1660 into a cruciform church. A new apse was added in 1666. This choir was replaced and enlarged in 1670. The transept was constructed in 1697–1698.  A gallery was added in 1702. The sacristy was rebuilt in 1739. Around 1760, an additional lining wall was placed on top of the structure and the church was extended to the west. A Baroque pulpit was added in 1763.

Architect and art historian Herman Major Schirmer conducted surveys of Rollag Stave Church in 1911 while he chaired the Society for the Preservation of Ancient Norwegian Monuments. Rollag Stave Church underwent restoration work in 1932.

Gallery

References

Other sources
 Leif Anker (2005) The Norwegian Stave Churches (Oslo: Arfo Forlag)

External links
 Rollag stave church in a video about churches in Numedal

12th-century churches in Norway
Churches in Viken
Rollag
Stave churches in Norway